Ronald Harry Eddie Chisholm (22 May 1927 – 23 November 2006) was a Scottish cricketer who holds the Scottish record for most first class appearances. 

Chisholm's only career century was made against Ireland in 1970 and he once took 5 for 57 against the MCC at Lord's. He made 15,870 runs in club cricket.

References

External links
Cricket Europe profile

1927 births
2006 deaths
Cricketers from Aberdeen
Scottish cricketers